In early 1975, the North American Soccer League hosted its first league-wide indoor soccer tournament over the course of seven weeks. All but four NASL teams participated.

Overview
Though the Dallas Tornado had won the NASL's 1971 Hoc-Soc Tournament and the Atlanta Apollos staged two league sanctioned pilot matches at the Omni in 1973, the birth of the modern game in North America can be traced to 1974, when three indoor exhibitions against the touring Soviet Red Army of Moscow club took place. The games were played on a field the size of a hockey rink, with goals 4 feet high by 16 feet wide. Much like hockey, matches were played in three 20 minute periods, allowed free substitution, and featured six man sides (five field players and a goalkeeper). The Soviets beat an outmatched NASL All-Star team 8–4 on February 7 at Toronto's Maple Leaf Gardens. The second game against the reigning champion Philadelphia Atoms on February 11, is considered by many as the watershed event of North American indoor soccer. The game stayed close into the third period, though the Red Army squad eventually pulled away 6–3. On February 13 the Russians closed out their tour with an 11–4 throttling of the St. Louis Stars in Missouri before an impressive crowd of 12,241.

In spite of the losses, and because another 11,790 curious fans packed Philadelphia's Spectrum to watch this "new" game, the NASL began considering indoor soccer's potential to increase fan interest in the sport as a whole. A month and seven days later a Spectrum crowd of 6,314 turned out to watch the Atoms defeat the New York Cosmos 5–3. With this, franchises also recognized that they could generate more revenue from players already under contract. The league hinted at having a 10-game indoor season in early 1975, but by autumn eventually scaled that plan back. The following year the NASL staged an indoor tournament: sixteen of the twenty teams participated. It was divided into four regional tournaments, with the regional winners meeting in San Francisco for the overall title in a similar format to the NCAA college basketball tournament. In the regionals, two teams would play each other, and then winners would play losers in a two-game series. The team with the best record advanced to the semifinals; in the event of teams having identical records, the side with the best total goal differential advanced out of the region. That first year the goals stayed 4 x 16 and the games remained divided into three 20 minute frames like those played against the Red Army club the previous year.

Four NASL clubs, Chicago, Denver, Portland and San Antonio did not participate in the tournament. However three of them were recently announced, expansion teams that had yet to play an outdoor season either.

The San Jose Earthquakes defeated the newly formed Tampa Bay Rowdies 8–5 in the Championship Final. Paul Child of San Jose scored seven goals in the regionals, and added another seven during the final four to lead all goal scorers. Child and teammate Gabbo Garvic shared the MVP honors.

Pre-1975 NASL indoor matches

1975 Indoor Regional tournaments

Region 1
played at Fair Park Coliseum in Dallas, Texas

*Dallas wins region on goal differential, advances to semifinals

Region 2
played at Rochester War Memorial in Rochester, New York

*New York wins region on goal differential, advances to semifinals

Region 3
played at the Bayfront Center in St. Petersburg, Florida

*Tampa Bay wins region on goal differential, advances to semifinals
Region 3 MVP: Ringo Cantillo (Tampa Bay) – 4 goals

Region 4
played at the Cow Palace in Daly City, California

#Vancouver and San Jose won by such large margins, that the NASL and the two teams agreed to a head-to-head pairing on Feb. 28.

*San Jose wins region, advances to semifinals
Region 4 MVP: Paul Child (San Jose) – 7 goals

1975 Indoor Final Four

Bracket

Semi-finals
played at the Cow Palace in Daly City, California

Third-place match
played at the Cow Palace in Daly City, California

Championship final

1975 NASL Indoor Champions: San Jose Earthquakes
Television: CBS (tape delayed)

Final Four awards
Most Valuable Player: Paul Child (San Jose) & Gabbo Garvic (San Jose)
All-tournament Team: Paul Child (San Jose), Doug Wark (Tampa Bay), Ilija Mitić (Dallas), Gabbo Garvic (San Jose), Mike Renshaw (Dallas), Ken Cooper (Dallas)

Final Four statistics

Final team rankings
G = Games, W = Wins, L = Losses, GF = Goals For, GA = Goals Against, GD = Goal Differential

Non-tournament matches
In addition to the Region 4 and Final Four tournament games (eight contests in all), the San Jose Earthquakes also hosted two other indoor matches at the Cow Palace as tune-ups for the impending tournament. The first one was dubbed the "Calamity Cup" because it pitted the Earthquakes against the Tornado. The second was against their in-state rival, Los Angeles Aztecs. The two matches drew a combined 20,908 spectators and San Jose won both. In another match, the Rochester Lancers hosted the Toronto Metros-Croatia on March 29 in front of 2,562 fans at the Rochester War Memorial. Toronto won the game, 10–7.

Match reports

References

NASL Indoor seasons
1975 in American soccer
1975 in American soccer leagues
Indoor
NASL Indoor tournament
NASL Indoor tournament
NASL Indoor tournament
NASL Indoor tournament
1975